Silent Force is a German power metal band with neoclassical and progressive influences, founded by German guitarist Alex Beyrodt.

Band history
The band was formed in 1999 by German guitarist Alex Beyrodt (Sinner, Primal Fear, Voodoo Circle, The Sygnet) and American singer D.C. Cooper (of Royal Hunt fame). In 2000 their debut album The Empire of Future was released; along with Beyrodt and Cooper there were also Torsten Röhre on keyboards, André Hilgers (who will later play with Rage) and Thorsten Fleisch on bass. In 2001 their second studio album, Infatuator was released by Massacre Records with the addition of Jürgen Steinmetz replacing Fleisch on bass. In 2004 the band moved to Noise Records and with them they released their third studio album Worlds Apart. Their fourth album Walk the Earth was released in February 2007 on AFM Records. In 2013, after a seven-year hiatus, the fifth album is a comeback for the band with a new line-up, featuring vocalist Michael Bormann, bassist Mat Sinner and keyboard player Alessandro Del Vecchio joining the band with Beyrodt and Hilgers retaining their positions. The album title is Rising from Ashes.

Members
 Alex Beyrodt - guitars
 André Hilgers - drums
 Michael Bormann - vocals
 Mat Sinner - bass
 Alessandro Del Vecchio - keyboards

Former members
 D. C. Cooper - vocals
 Jürgen Steinmetz - bass
 Torsten Röhre - keyboards
 Thorsten Fleisch - bass

Timeline

Discography
 The Empire of Future (2000)
 Infatuator (2001)
 Worlds Apart (2004)
 Walk the Earth (2007)
 Rising from Ashes (2013)

References

External links
Official Site
Official Alex Beyrodt Site

German power metal musical groups
AFM Records artists
Frontiers Records artists
Noise Records artists